775 may refer to:
 
775, year
Area code 775
Code page 775
LGA 775, Intel socket